Special Final in Dome Memorial Collection is the third Japanese extended play by South Korean boy band Big Bang, released on December 5, 2012. It was released as a part of their 2012 Alive concert tour.

Background
BigBang became the first Korean musical artists to perform in all three of Japan's biggest dome venues: Tokyo's Tokyo Dome, Osaka's Kyocera Dome and Fukuoka's Yahoo! Japan Dome. It was announced on November 6, 2012, That they will release a special mini-album featuring five songs by the members respective solo projects and the Japanese version of the group song "Fantastic Baby".

Chart performance
The EP charted six on Oricon album chart, selling 45,910 copies in the first week.

Track listing

Charts

Weekly charts

Release history

References

External links
Big Bang Official Site
Big Bang Japan Official Site

BigBang (South Korean band) EPs
2012 EPs
YG Entertainment EPs
Avex Group EPs
Japanese-language EPs
Albums produced by G-Dragon